Sebastian Christopher Peter Mallaby (born May 1964) is an English journalist and author, Paul A. Volcker senior fellow for international economics at the Council on Foreign Relations (CFR), and contributing columnist at The Washington Post. Formerly, he was a contributing editor for the Financial Times and a columnist and editorial board member at The Washington Post.

His recent writing has been published in The New York Times, The Wall Street Journal, and the Atlantic Monthly. In 2012, he published a Foreign Affairs essay on the future of China's currency. His books include The Man Who Knew (2016), More Money Than God (2010), and The World's Banker (2004).

Early life
Sebastian Mallaby was born in May 1964, the son of Sir Christopher Mallaby, who was Ambassador of the United Kingdom to Germany (1988–1993) and Ambassador of the United Kingdom to France (1993–1996), and Lady Pascale Mallaby. Sebastian was educated at Eton College, won an academic scholarship to Oxford University, and graduated in 1986 with a First Class degree in modern history. His interests include financial markets, the implications of the rise of newly emerging powers, and the intersection of economics and international relations.

Career
Mallaby worked at The Washington Post from 1999 to 2007 as a columnist and member of the editorial board. Prior to that he spent thirteen years with The Economist, in London, where he wrote about foreign policy and international finance. He also spent time in Africa, where he covered Nelson Mandela’s release and the collapse of apartheid; and in Japan, where he covered the breakdown of the country's political and economic consensus during the 90s.

Between 1997 and 1999 Mallaby was the Economist’s Washington bureau chief and wrote the magazine's weekly "Lexington" column on American politics and foreign policy. His 2002 Foreign Affairs essay "The Reluctant Imperialist" about failed states was cited by commentators in The New York Times, Financial Times, and Time magazine. Mallaby is a two-time Pulitzer Prize finalist: in 2005 for editorials on Darfur and in 2007 for a series on economic inequality in America.

He wrote a long read for The Guardian on 'the cult of the expert - and how it collapsed'.

Books
Mallaby's books include After Apartheid (1992), which was a New York Times Notable Book. The World's Banker (2004) is a portrait of the World Bank under James Wolfensohn.  An essay in the Financial Times said of The World's Banker, "Mallaby's book may well be the most hilarious depiction of a big organization and its controversial boss since Michael Lewis's Liar's Poker."

Mallaby published a history of the hedge-fund industry in More Money Than God: Hedge Funds and the Making of a New Elite (2010). Washington Post columnist Steve Pearlstein called it "the definitive history of the hedge fund industry, a compelling narrative full of larger-than-life characters and dramatic tales of their financial triumphs and reversals." It was the recipient of the 2011 Gerald Loeb Award, a finalist in the 2010 Financial Times and Goldman Sachs Business Book of the Year Award, and a 2010 New York Times bestseller.

After five years of extensive research and in-person interviews, Mallaby's book The Man Who Knew: The Life and Times of Alan Greenspan was published in October 2016. A biography of former Fed Chair Alan Greenspan, The Man Who Knew was praised by Mervyn King, former Governor of the Bank of England, as "A fascinating and balanced study of arguably the most important figure of the post-war global financial scene." It won the 2016 Financial Times and McKinsey Business Book of the Year Award.

In 2022, Mallaby published his fifth book, The Power Law: Venture Capital and the Making of the New Future, a history of the venture capital industry's development in the U.S. and globally over the last seven decades.

Personal life
Mallaby is married to the English journalist and Editor-in-Chief for The Economist, Zanny Minton Beddoes. They have four children.

References

External links

Author Sebastian Mallaby, Charlie Rose show, 14 July 2010.
Sebastian Mallaby at the Financial Times

Living people
1964 births
English journalists
People educated at Eton College
Alumni of the University of Oxford
Sebastian
Gerald Loeb Award winners for Business Books